Skorvehalsen Saddle is an ice saddle immediately south of Huldreskorvene Peaks in the Muhlig-Hofmann Mountains, Queen Maud Land. Mapped by Norwegian cartographers from surveys and air photos by the Norwegian Antarctic Expedition (1956–60) and named Skorvehalsen.

Mountain passes of Queen Maud Land
Princess Astrid Coast